The 2006 Pavel Roman Memorial was the 12th edition of an annual international ice dancing competition held in Olomouc, Czech Republic. The event was held between November 17 and 19, 2006. Ice dancers competed in the senior, junior, and novice levels.

Results

Senior

External links
 results

Pavel Roman Memorial, 2006
Pavel Roman Memorial